Krka is a river in Croatia's Dalmatia region, known for its numerous waterfalls. It was known in ancient Greek as Kyrikos, or may be also as Catarbates (literally "steeply falling") by the ancient Greeks, it was known to the ancient Romans as Titius, Corcoras, or Korkoras.

Course

The river has its source near the border of Croatia with Bosnia and Herzegovina, at the foot of the Dinara mountain. The river then flows through the valley, where it is fed by the Kosovčica on the left and the Orašnica and the Butižnica on the right, passing the Fortress of Knin between the last two on the way, and into the main canyon.

What follows belongs to the Krka National Park. They lead to the Brljansko lake with a waterfall in its middle, of nearly equal height. Here, on the right bank, lie the Roman ruins of Burnum. At the far end of the canyon are the ruins of the medieval castles of Nečven on the left and Trošenj opposite it. Beyond it is the Serbian Orthodox Krka monastery. Still further, the river forms the  Visovačko lake, with the Franciscan order Visovac Monastery on the island in the middle of the lake. The lake ends at the confluence of the Krka and its largest tributary, the Čikola.

From this point on, the river is navigable from the sea.

Development

This area is also the location of the first hydroelectric power station using alternate current in Croatia, the Jaruga Hydroelectric Power Plant. This plant started supplying power to the nearby city of Šibenik in 1895.

Pollution

Parts of the Krka river were heavily mined during the Yugoslav Wars. As of 2016, many fields bordering the canyon between Visovačko lake and Prokljansko lake on the right bank, and between Nečven and Visovačko lake on the left bank, have yet to be demined. Tourist areas and paved roads are no longer affected.

See also
 Jaruga Hydroelectric Power Plant
 Krčić Hydroelectric Power Plant
 Krka monastery
 Krka National Park
 Miljacka Hydroelectric Power Plant
 Roški Slap Hydroelectric Power Plant
 Visovac Monastery

References

Bibliography

External links 

Rivers of Croatia
 
Landforms of Šibenik-Knin County